Shantanurao Laxmanrao Kirloskar (28 May 1903 – 24 April 1994) was an Indian businessman who was instrumental in the rapid growth of the Kirloskar Group.

S. L. Kirloskar was the son of Laxmanrao Kirloskar, who established the Kirloskar Group and the township of Kirloskarwadi.  S. L. Kirloskar earned a Bachelor of Science degree in mechanical engineering from MIT in Cambridge, Massachusetts, U.S. He was also among the first Indians to graduate from MIT.

S. L. Kirloskar was a global thinker and an enterprising person who had the courage and the confidence in the potential of his own country even in the pre-independence era. He often said, "Economic preparedness is as vital as military preparedness." He viewed India as a part of the rest of the world and worked towards making India globally competitive.

After the end of World War II, the Kirloskar Group grew rapidly under the leadership of S. L. Kirloskar. In 1946, he established Kirloskar Electric Company and Kirloskar Oil Engines Limited at Bangalore and Pune, respectively. He is credited with developing the manufacture of diesel engine indigenously as an import substitute after India attained independence. He penned an autobiography under the title Cactus and Roses.

S. L. Kirloskar was awarded Padma Bhushan in the year 1965 for his contribution to trade and industry.

On 26 February 2003, Atal Bihari Vajpayee, the then Prime Minister of India, released a commemorative postage stamp marking the 100th anniversary of S. L. Kirloskar's birth.

Awards
Rashtrabhushan Award of FIE Foundation, Ichalkaranji

References

External links
india.gov.in
Kirloskar Group
Kirloskar Brothers Limited, Kirloskar Group Flagship Company
Time Magazine article on Mr. S.L. Kirloskar
A write-up on 100 years of Kirloskar Group on the occasion of release of a commemorative postal stamp
Director's report – Kirloskar Oil Engines Limited
Speech by the President of India on occasion of S. L. Kirloskar's birth centenary
Birthdate of S. L. Kirloskar

1903 births
1994 deaths
Businesspeople from Pune
Recipients of the Padma Bhushan in trade and industry
Marathi people
Kirloskar Group
MIT School of Engineering alumni